Bobby-Gaye Wilkins (born 10 September 1988) is a Jamaican athlete who represented Jamaica at the 2008 Olympic Games in Beijing, China, winning a bronze medal in the 4×400 metres relay.

Her first major international appearance came at the 2005 World Youth Championships in Athletics, where she reached the final of the 400 metres.

She was selected as a reserve for the relay at the 2009 World Championships in Athletics, but she did not compete. She reached the semi-finals of the 400 m at the 2010 IAAF World Indoor Championships, but enjoyed greater success in the women's relay: along with Clora Williams, Davita Prendergast and Novlene Williams-Mills, she won the bronze medal in a Jamaican indoor record of 3:28.49 (also a Central American and Caribbean record).

However, she failed her drug test at the competition, and the Jamaican team was disqualified. Her sample contained andarine (a selective androgen receptor modulator), making her the second international runner to test positive for the class of anabolic drugs, after Thomas Goller. She received a two-year ban from competitive athletics for the infraction.

Personal bests

Achievements 

1: Competed only in the heat.

See also
List of doping cases in athletics

References

External links

1988 births
Living people
People from Trelawny Parish
Jamaican female sprinters
Athletes (track and field) at the 2008 Summer Olympics
Olympic athletes of Jamaica
Olympic bronze medalists for Jamaica
Athletes (track and field) at the 2015 Pan American Games
Doping cases in athletics
Jamaican sportspeople in doping cases
Medalists at the 2008 Summer Olympics
Pan American Games medalists in athletics (track and field)
Pan American Games silver medalists for Jamaica
Medalists at the 2015 Pan American Games
Olympic female sprinters
21st-century Jamaican women